Rasmus Hansen may refer to:

Rasmus Hansen (footballer born 1979), Danish football midfielder
Rasmus Hansen (gymnast) (1885–1967), Danish gymnast
Rasmus Hansen (politician) (1797–1860s), Norwegian jurist and politician
Rasmus Grønborg Hansen (born 1986), Danish football defensive midfielder
Rasmus Quist Hansen (born 1980), Danish rower
Rasmus Hansen (Danish politician), served as Defence Minister of Denmark in the 1940s and 1950s

Similar Spellings 
Rasmus Hansson (born 1954), Norwegian biologist, civil servant, environmental activist and politician